Deulgaon, commonly known as "Deulgaon Dhudhate" is a village located in Purna taluka of Parbhani district, in state of Maharashtra.

Demographics
As per 2011 census:
Deulgaon Dhudhate has 690 families residing. The village has population of 3355.
Out of the population of 3355, 1722 are males while 1633 are females.
Literacy rate of the village is 66.15%.
Average sex ratio of the village is 948 females to 1000 males. Average sex ratio of Maharashtra state is 929.

Geography, and transport

References

Villages in Parbhani district